Ignacio Andrés Jara Vargas (born 28 January 1997) is a Chilean professional footballer who plays as a midfielder for Cobreloa on loan from Colo-Colo.

He was trained as professional footballer in Cobreloa youth system in Santiago de Chile since 2006.

Club career
His first call up to the U-20 Chile team was in May 2016, and scored his first goal against Everton de Viña del Mar in a friendly match also.
 
He was called up by coach Juan Antonio Pizzi to the absolute national Chile team on 27 May 2016 against the national team of Jamaica, he was an alternate player during all the match and the México match also on 1 June 2016, his second absolute national football match. He was invited to collaborate as sparring of the absolute national team during Copa America Centenario competition.

He made his professional debut in Cobreloa versus Ñublense match, valid for sixth game week of Primera B de Chile, on 10 September 2016. He was enter in 83' replacing Josepablo Monreal.

His first professional goal was in Cobreloa versus Deportes La Serena match, valid for Copa Chile 2016 competition, on 15 September 2016. In 90'.

Goiás
On 13 February 2020 Jara signed with Campeonato Brasileiro Série A club Goiás

International career
Jara represented Chile U20 in the 2017 South American Championship. At under-23 level, Jara represented Chile in both the 2019 Toulon Tournament and the 2020 Pre-Olympic Tournament.

At senior level, he was a substitute in the friendly matches against Jamaica and Mexico in 2016.

References

External links
 Ignacio Jara's Profile and Statistics at Soccerpunter
 

1996 births
Living people
Footballers from Santiago
Chilean footballers
Chile under-20 international footballers
Chilean expatriate footballers
Cobreloa footballers
Colo-Colo footballers
Goiás Esporte Clube players
Unión Española footballers
Primera B de Chile players
Chilean Primera División players
Campeonato Brasileiro Série A players
Chilean expatriate sportspeople in Brazil
Expatriate footballers in Brazil
Association football forwards